John Baxter (born 14 December 1939 in Randwick, New South Wales, Australia) is an Australian-born writer, journalist, and film-maker.

Baxter has lived in Britain and the United States as well as in his native Sydney, but has made his home in Paris since 1989, where he is married to the film-maker Marie-Dominique Montel. They have one daughter, Louise.

He began writing science fiction in the early 1960s for New Worlds, Science Fantasy and other British magazines. His first novel, though serialised in New Worlds as THE GOD KILLERS, was published as a book in the US by Ace as The Off-Worlders.  He was Visiting Professor at Hollins College in Virginia in 1975-1976.  He has written a number of short stories and novels in that genre and a book  about SF in the movies, as well as editing  collections of Australian science fiction.

Baxter has also written a large number of other works dealing with the movies, including biographies of film personalities, including Federico Fellini, Luis Buñuel, Steven Spielberg, Stanley Kubrick, Woody Allen, George Lucas and Robert De Niro.  He has written a number of documentaries, including a survey of the life and work of the painter Fernando Botero. He also co-produced, wrote and presented three television series for the Australian Broadcasting Commission, Filmstruck, First Take and The Cutting Room, and was co-editor of the ABC book programme Books And Writing.

In 1973 Baxter published the first critical account of the work of British film maker Ken Russell,  An Appalling Talent. The book was based on an extended interview with the director and covers his work from Amelia and the Angel (1958) to The Boy Friend (1971), while observing the shooting of the film Savage Messiah (1973) and the state of the British film industry.

In the 1960s, he was a member of the WEA Film Study Group with such notable people as Ian Klava, Frank Moorhouse, Michael Thornhill, John Flaus and Ken Quinnell. 
From July 1965 to December 1967 the WEA Film Study Group published the cinema journal FILM DIGEST. This journal was edited by John Baxter.

For a number of years in the sixties, he was active in the Sydney Film Festival, and during the 1980s served in a consulting capacity on a number of film-funding bodies, as well as writing film criticism for The Australian and other periodicals.  Some of his books have been translated into various languages, including Japanese and Chinese.

Since moving to Paris, he has written four books of autobiography, A Pound of Paper:  Confessions of a Book Addict, We'll Always Have Paris:  Sex and Love in the City of Light, Immoveable feast : a Paris Christmas, and The Most Beautiful Walk in the World : a Pedestrian in Paris.

Since 2007 he has been co-director of the annual Paris Writers Workshop.

Publications

Novels 

 The Black Yacht, 1982
 "Scorched" as "James Blackstone", pseudonym of Baxter and John Brosnan. (about spontaneous human combustion)
 Bidding
 The Hermes Fall, 1978 (about a possible collision of the asteroid Hermes and the earth)
 The Off-Worlders, 1966 (about a planet where superstition rules)

Edited collections 

 The Second Pacific Book of Australian Science Fiction, 1971
The Pacific Book of Australian Science Fiction, 1968

Nonfiction 
 Montmartre: Paris's Village of Art and Sin, 2017
 Eating Eternity: Food, Art, and Literature in France, 2017 
 Saint-Germain-des-Prés: Paris's Rebel Quarter, 2016
 Five Nights in Paris: After Dark in the City of Light, 2015
 Paris at the End of the World: The City of Light During the Great War, 1914-1918, 2014
 The Inner Man: The Life of J. G. Ballard. London: Weidenfeld & Nicolson, 2011
 The Most Beautiful Walk in the World : a Pedestrian in Paris, 2011
 Cooking for Claudine, 2011
  Immoveable feast : a Paris Christmas , 2008
 We'll Always Have Paris:  Sex and Love in the City of Light, 2006
 A Pound of Paper:  Confessions of a Book Addict, 2002
 The Fire Came by: The Riddle of the Great Siberian Explosion, 1976

Film books

 George Lucas: A Biography , 1999
 Woody Allen:  A Biography, 1998
 Buñuel, 1998
 Stanley Kubrick: A Biography, 1997
 De Niro: A Biography, 2003
 Filmstruck: Australia at the Movies. , 1986
 The Hollywood Exiles, 1976
 King Vidor, 1976
 Stunt; the Story of the Great Movie Stunt Men , 1974
 Sixty Years of Hollywood, 1973
 An Appalling Talent:  Ken Russell, 1973
 The Cinema of Josef von Sternberg, 1971
 The Australian Cinema, 1970
 Science Fiction in the Cinema, 1970
 Hollywood in the Thirties, 1968
 Hollywood in the Sixties, 1972

Filmography 

 The Time Guardian, 1987

External links 
 http://sites.google.com/site/johnbaxterparis/
 
 http://www.fantasticfiction.co.uk/b/john-baxter/

References 

Living people
1939 births
20th-century Australian novelists
20th-century Australian male writers
Australian male novelists
Australian non-fiction writers
Australian emigrants to France
Writers from Sydney
Australian Book Review people
Male non-fiction writers